Uromastyx acanthinura, the North African mastigure or North African spiny-tailed lizard, is a species of agamid lizard. It is found in Morocco, Algeria, Tunisia, Libya, Egypt, Western Sahara, Chad, Mali, Niger, and Sudan.

References

Uromastyx
Reptiles described in 1825
Taxa named by Thomas Bell (zoologist)